Siccia buettikeri is a moth in the  family Erebidae. It was described by Wiltshire in 1988. It is found in Saudi Arabia.

References

Natural History Museum Lepidoptera generic names catalog

Moths described in 1988
Nudariina
Moths of the Middle East